Diamond grinding is a pavement preservation technique that corrects a variety of surface imperfections on both concrete and asphalt concrete pavements. Most often utilized on concrete pavement, diamond grinding is typically performed in conjunction with other concrete pavement preservation (CPP) techniques such as road slab stabilization, full- and partial-depth repair, dowel bar retrofit, cross stitching longitudinal cracks or joints and joint and crack resealing. Diamond grinding restores rideability by removing surface irregularities caused during construction or through repeated traffic loading over time. The immediate effect of diamond grinding is a significant improvement in the smoothness of a pavement. Another important effect of diamond grinding is the considerable increase in surface macrotexture and consequent improvement in skid resistance, noise reduction and safety.

History
The industry can be traced back to an event where a single diamond blade mounted on a concrete saw was used to groove concrete pavement in the late 1940s. Since that early tentative step, concrete grinding, grooving and texturing with diamond blades has developed into what is today a multimillion-dollar industry that is practiced worldwide.

One of the first uses of diamond grinding of highway pavement was in 1965 on a 19-year-old section of Interstate 10 in California to eliminate excessive faulting. The pavement was ground again in 1984 and in 1997, and it is still carrying heavy traffic today, more than 60 years after it was first constructed.

Process

Diamond grinding involves removing a thin layer at the surface of hardened PCC using closely spaced diamond saw blades. The level surface is achieved by running the blade assembly at a predetermined level across the pavement surface, which produces saw cut grooves. The uncut concrete between each saw cut breaks off more or less at a constant level above the saw cut grooves, leaving a level surface (at a macroscopic level) with longitudinal texture. The result is a pavement that is smooth, safe, quiet and pleasing to travel.

The diamond blades are composed of industrial diamonds and metallurgical powder. When grinding materials contain hard aggregate materials, a diamond blade with a soft bond is needed, which means that the metallurgical powders in the cutting segments of the blade wear fast enough to expose the diamond cutting media at the proper rate for efficient cutting. Conversely, to cut soft aggregates, a diamond blade with a hard bond is recommended.

Diamond grinding should not be confused with milling or scarifying. Milling is an impact process that chips small pieces of concrete from the pavement surface. Diamond grinding is a cutting process.

For grinding asphalt to remove old pavement, see pavement milling.

Applications
There are many surface issues that diamond grinding can improve or correct. Some of the surface imperfections that can be addressed by diamond grinding include: faulting at joints and cracks, built-in or construction roughness, polished concrete surfaces exhibiting inadequate macrotexture, wheel path rutting caused by studded tires, unacceptable noise level, slab warping caused by moisture gradient and construction curling, inadequate transverse slope and splash and spray reduction.

Cost-effectiveness
Diamond grinding is a cost-effective treatment, whether used alone or as part of an overall concrete pavement restoration (CPR) program. In most cases, the cost of diamond grinding is only about half the cost of bituminous overlays. This cost competitiveness, in conjunction with eliminating bituminous overlay problems (rutting, corrugation, poor skid resistance, drainage reduction, vertical clearance reduction) makes diamond grinding an alternative for many rehabilitation projects. Diamond grinding can be used as part of any preventive maintenance program for concrete pavements.

Caltrans reports that the average life of a diamond-ground surface is between 16 and 17 years. On average, more than 2,000 lane-miles of concrete pavement are diamond ground every year.

Benefits

At the cost of employing diamond grinding equipment, several benefits are observed.  The process is used to restore or improve pavement ride quality. Restoring ride through grinding improves traffic carrying capacity and adds value to an in-place pavement.
Diamond grinding provides numerous benefits over other rehabilitation alternatives.

This repair technique also provides a smooth surface which is often as good as new pavement.
As trucks travel across bumps and dips, they bounce vertically on their suspension resulting in dynamic loading on the roadway. The increased load due to dynamic impact results in higher stresses in the pavement materials and consequently lower road life. By providing an extremely smooth surface, diamond grinding limits dynamic loading.

A potential benefit of diamond grinding may be reduced road noise, depending on the grinding technique used and the surface texture that is left. A longitudinal texture can provide a quieter surface than many transverse textures. A multi-state study on noise and texture on PCC pavements concluded that longitudinal texture concrete pavements are among the quietest pavements for interior and exterior noise. Diamond grinding can also remove faults by leveling the pavement surface, thus eliminating the thumping and slapping sound created by faulted joints.

Enhanced surface texture and skid resistance is another benefit of diamond grinding. The corrugated surface increases surface macrotexture and provides ample channels for water to displace beneath vehicle tires, reducing hydroplaning potential. Diamond grinding also improves cornering friction, providing directional stability by tire tread-pavement groove interlock.

Diamond grinding has been found to reduce accident rates in some scenarios. The increased macrotexture provides for improved drainage of water at the tire-pavement interface, thus improving wet-weather friction, particularly for vehicles with balding tires. The longitudinal nature of a diamond-ground texture also provides directional stability and reduces hydroplaning, thus contributing to the safety of diamond ground surfaces.

This technique does not significantly affect fatigue life. The reduction in thickness due to diamond grinding is highest at the faulted joint and lower at the interior. The small reduction in slab thickness caused by diamond grinding has negligible effect on service life. A typical concrete pavement may be ground up to three times and still add traffic carrying capacity. Diamond grinding does not affect material durability. The fact that the diamond-ground surface is nearly always dry (except during storms) reduces may reduce freeze-thaw problems. Diamond grinding does not introduce any unusual condition that would lead to poor surface durability.

This preservation method does not raise the pavement surface elevation. Grinding does not affect overhead clearances underneath bridges and eliminates the need for tapers at highway entrances, exits and at side streets. Grinding does not affect the hydraulic capacities of curbs and gutters on municipal streets. On the other hand, bituminous overlays fill curb and gutter, reducing drainage capabilities.

Diamond grinding should be applied to the portion of the pavement where restoration is needed. A highway agency can require grinding only on the truck lanes of a four-lane divided highway, presenting a significant cost advantage.

Finally, diamond grinding can be accomplished during off-peak hours with short lane closures, without having to close adjacent lanes. Diamond grinding can also be used on all road classes, from interstates to city streets.

See also

References

External links
 International Grooving & Grinding Association.net
 Concrete cut with saw

Concrete
Grinding and lapping